The Ilulissat Art Museum is an art museum in Ilulissat, Avannaata Municipality, Greenland.

History
The museum building was originally built in 1923 by architect Helge Møller. It served as the residence of the colony manager; 5 colony managers and 5 commercial principals have lived in the house. Later on, the house was acquired by the municipal colony and turned into the museum which was opened in 1995.

Exhibitions
The ground floor exhibits permanent exhibitions with about 50 paintings by Emanuel A. Petersen. The upper floor exhibits contemporary exhibitions by different visual artists. The museum also hosts an artist in residence program.

See also
 List of museums in Greenland

References

1995 establishments in Greenland
Art museums and galleries in Greenland
Ilulissat
Museums established in 1995